Francesca Williams (born 23 December 1997) is an English netballer who currently plays for Loughborough Lightning in the Netball Superleague. She previously played for Wasps Netball and Surrey Storm. She has been the captain of the England under-21 team, and made her debut for the England national team in November 2018 against Uganda. Williams made an instant impression in the national side and was later selected in England's 12-woman squad for the January 2019 Quad Series and the 2019 Netball World Cup.

References

External links 
 Interview with Fran Williams – The Netball Show

1996 births
Living people
English netball players
2019 Netball World Cup players
Netball Superleague players
Wasps Netball players
Surrey Storm players
People educated at Kendrick School
People educated at Reading Blue Coat School
Alumni of the University of Birmingham